Aung Pyae Sone is a Burmese business tycoon who owns a number of major companies, including Sky One Construction Company and Aung Myint Mo Min Insurance Company. He is also reportedly the biggest shareholder in national telecoms carrier Mytel. He is the son of Senior General Min Aung Hlaing, the current leader of Myanmar, concurrently serving as Chairman of the State Administrative Council and Commander-in-Chief of the Myanmar Armed Forces.

Business interests
Aung Pyae Some was born 24 June 1984 in Burma (now Myanmar). In 2013, Aung Pyae Sone won a no-bid government permit well below market rates, for a 30-year lease on land at the Yangon People's Park for a high-end restaurant and art gallery, following his father's promotion to Commander-in-Chief. Aung Pyae Sone also runs A&M Mahar, which offers Food and Drug Administration (FDA) approvals and customs clearance services for drugs and medical devices. Myanmar's customs department is led by Kyaw Htin, a former MEHL director.

Aung Pyae Sone was awarded an artificially low land lease from Yangon Region's government and serves alcohol in breach of a Yangon City Development Committee prohibition. He also owns the Kan Tharyar Hospital and Azura Beach Resort, which promotes itself as the largest resort in Chaungtha.

In 2019, United Nations fact-finding missions called for action against companies owned by Aung Pyae Sone.

The U.S. Department of the Treasury has imposed sanctions on him and his younger sister Khin Thiri Thet Mon since 10 March 2021, pursuant to Executive Order 14014, in response to the Burmese military's coup against the democratically elected civilian government of Myanmar. The sanctions include freezing of assets under the US and a ban on transactions with US persons. He became a major target of a domestic boycott and social punishment by people who oppose the military regime.

Aung Pyae Sone partially owns Golden Future Linkage, a solar power company. In January 2023, the military junta awarded the company a contract to build a 40-megawatt solar power plant in Mandalay Region’s Thazi Township.

In September 2022, Thai authorities arrested Burmese tycoon Tun Min Latt who is closely associated with Min Aung Hlaing and his family, on money laundering and drug trafficking charges, following a raid. The September 2022 raid found assets of Aung Pyae Sone's property title to a four-bedroom luxury condo worth nearly US$1 million in Bangkok's Belle Rama 9 complex, and his sister's bank records.

References

Burmese businesspeople
Living people
1984 births
Individuals related to Myanmar sanctions